Scott MacKenzie (born 21 February 1972) is a retired Brazilian-born British professional darts player based in Hong Kong. He has represented Hong Kong on numerous occasions (in both steel tip and soft tip darts), including captaining the Hong Kong team at the 2008 Asia Pacific Cup in New Zealand and 2012 team to Australia. He was also a member of the 2010 and 2016 Asia Pacific Cup teams. He has played in a total of 3 PDC World Championships and 3 PDC World Cups currently more than any other Hong Kong darts player.

Career
MacKenzie won the PDC Greater China Qualifier, defeating Alex Hon in the final, to qualify for the 2011 PDC World Darts Championship. He became the first player from Hong Kong to qualify for a World Darts Championship. He played Germany's Jyhan Artut in the preliminary round, and missed two darts to win the match before losing 3-4.

MacKenzie qualified for his second successive PDC World Championship in 2012 after defeating Royden Lam in the PDC Greater China Qualifier final. He beat Paul Barham 4-2 in the best of seven legs preliminary round match to make it through to the last 64 for the first time. He played former World quarter-finalist, Wayne Jones, and was beaten 1-3. In the rest of 2012 he lost in the quarter-finals of the Pacific Masters to Tony Carmichael and was also defeated in the semi-finals of the WDF Asia-Pacific Cup and Hong Kong Open. He entered the PDC Qualifying School in an attempt to win a 2-year tour card but could not finish in the top 4 on any of the four days, but finished high enough in the rankings to eventually play in the pro tour events during that year.

MacKenzie made his debut in the World Cup of Darts in June 2014 where he represented Hong Kong with Royden Lam, they have played in a total of 3 PDC World Cups together. They defeated Norway 5–2 in the first round in 2014 to face Australia in the second round. Lam lost his singles match against Simon Whitlock, before MacKenzie saw off Paul Nicholson to mean a doubles match was required to settle the tie, which Hong Kong were whitewashed in 4–0.

Mackenzie qualified for his 3rd PDC World Championship in 2015 where MacKenzie reached the final of the 2015 World Championship PDPA qualifier and lost 5–2 to Jason Hogg. However, it was enough to earn him a spot in the preliminary round of the event where he raced into a 3–0 lead over Daryl Gurney and missed one dart to win 4–0. Gurney levelled the match at 3–3, before MacKenzie missed a dart at double 11 to complete a 142 finish and was defeated 4–3. MacKenzie and Lam caused a couple of shocks at the World Cup. First they defeated Wales' Mark Webster and Jamie Lewis 5–3. Lam then beat Ireland's William O'Connor 4–1, but MacKenzie missed six match darts against Connie Finnan from 3–0 up to lose 4–3 meaning a doubles match was needed to settle the tie. It went to the final leg in which MacKenzie finished 86 to send Hong Kong into the quarter-finals. However, number two seeds Scotland proved to be too much as Gary Anderson and Peter Wright won both their singles matches 4–2 to eliminate Hong Kong. MacKenzie claimed the 2015 Hong Kong Open by beating Alex Hon. Mackenzie and Lam represented Hong Kong for a third successive time at the PDC World Cup in 2016 where again they played Ireland, a team consisting of William O'Connor and Mick McGowan, and they eventually lost 5–4 in the first round.

Mackenzie has stated he has suffered from dartitis since the middle of 2014 which has greatly affected his form and results, but has managed to keep it at bay to a certain extent.

World Championship results

PDC

 2011: Preliminary round (lost to Jyhan Artut 3–4) (legs)
 2012: First round (lost to Wayne Jones 1–3)
 2015: Preliminary round (lost to Daryl Gurney 3–4) (legs)

Personal life
MacKenzie was born in São Paulo to a Japanese-Brazilian mother and a Scottish father. After spending the first six years of his life in Brazil, MacKenzie and his family relocated to the UK. He moved to Hong Kong in 1996.

He obtained a BSc followed by a MSc in Chemistry whilst studying at the University of Kent. He was sponsored by Puma darts and has also recently been sponsored by Dartslive, DMC Darts and L-style. When not playing darts, he is an investor relations manager for a hedge fund. He is a fan of conspiracy theories associated with David Icke and often uses flights as well as wearing a sponsorship patch with DavidIcke.com written on during tournaments as free advertising.

References

External links

1972 births
Living people
Hong Kong darts players
Hong Kong people of Scottish descent
Hong Kong people of Japanese descent
Hong Kong people of Brazilian descent
Brazilian people of Scottish descent
Brazilian people of Japanese descent
Alumni of the University of Kent
Professional Darts Corporation associate players
PDC World Cup of Darts team Hong Kong